Høvdingsgård  is a manor house and estate located just east of Mern, Vordingborg Municipality, Denmark. The Late Neoclassical, two-storey main building is from 1852 but was widened in 1901. Anders Lassen, the only non-Commonwealth recipient of the British Victoria Cross in the Second World War, was born on the estate in 1920.

History

17th and 18th century
 
The origins and early history is unclear but the estate is first mentioned as Høvdingshus in records from the beginning of the 17th century and again in Christian V's Matrikel. It was then a rather small manor owned by the Crown. Om 1719, it was included in Vordingborg Cavalry District. Høvdingsgaard was the largest of the 77 farms in the Parish of Mern.

 
In 1774, Vordingborg Cavalry District was divided into 12 estates and sold in public auction. Two of the estates, No. 10 and No. 11, were bought by Hans Gustav Lillienskiold. One of them kept the name Høvdingshus and the other one was given the name Lilliendal. Much of the land was leased by Peder Neergaard from Billeborg at Herfølge.

In 1785, Lillienskiold sold both estates to the wealthy merchant Niels Lunde Reiersen from Copenhagen. He was already the owner of Nysø, Jungshoved and Oremandsgaard. The two new estates consolidated his status as one of the largest landowners on Southern Zealand. He died unmarried in 1795.

19th century
 
In 1795, Høvdingsgaard and Lilliendal were sold to Attorney General Peter Uldall. He had earlier in his career been the defense attorney  of Queen Caroline Mathilde and Johann Friedrich Struensee. Peter Uldall passed away just two years after buying the estates. He had prior to his death changed the name of the Høvdingshus estate to Høvdingsgård. His widow, Anthonette Hansen, sold Høvdingsgård and Lilliendal buyers around a year later.

The new owner of Høvdingsgård was Lars Terpager Hagen. He had previously leased Petersgaard from his father-in-law Peter Johansen. Lars Terpager Hagen's son, Peter Hagen, inherited the estate after hisfather's death in 1833. He was hit by mental decease and died in 1848. Høvdingsgård was then passed to his sister, Maren Regine Hagen, and her husband, Ernst Frederik Andreas Bilsted. In 1852, Bilsted constructed a new main building with the assistance of the architect Vilhelm Theodor Walther. Ernst Frederik Andreas Bilsted died in 1871. In 1883, Maren Regine Hagen ceded the estate to their two sons-in-law, Fritz Peter Adolph Uldall and Bredo Ove Ernst von Obelitz, who both lived in Copenhagen. Fritz Peter Adolph Uldall. who was the great-grandson of Peter Ildall, was a vice admiral in the Royal Danish Navy. Bredo Ove Ernst von Obelitz was a Supreme Court justice.

20th century
In 1901, Høvdingsgård was acquired by A. F. J. C. Lassen. He had previously been the owner of a tobacco plantation on Sumatra. In 1917, it was sold to his son Emil Victor Schou Lassen. He was married to Suzanne Marie Raben-Levetzau. Their son Anders Lassen, was born on the estate in 1920. He would later be only non-Commonwealth recipient of the British Victoria Cross in the Second World War. 

In 1938, Høvdingsgaard was acquired by the merchant Hans Lystrup. His daughter, Karen Marie Hansdatter Lystrup, who was married to Anders Dinesen, inherited the estate after her father's death in 1963.

Today
Høvdingsgtård  is currently owned by Anita Halbye (née Dinesen). The estate has a total area of 792 hectares.

Cultural references
Høvdingsgård was used as a location for the eponymous, fictional manor house in the 1953 feature film Hejrenæs (1953).

List of owners
 ( -1774) The Crown
 (1774-1785) Hans Gustav Lillienskiold 
 (1785-1795) Niels Lunde Reiersen 
 (1795-1798) Peter Uldall 
 (1798-1799) Anthonette Uldall, née Hansen 
 (1799-1833) Lars Terpager Hagen 
 (1833-1848) Peter Larsen Hagen 
 (1848-1871) Ernst Frederik Andreas Bilsted 
 (1871-1873) Maren Regine Bilsted, née Hagen
 (1873-1901) Fritz Peter Adolph Uldall 
 (1873-1901) Bredo Ove Ernst von Obelitz
 (1901-1917) Axel Frederik Julius Christian Lassen 
 (1917-1929) Emil Victor Schau Lassen 
 (1929-1938) E. A. Hagstrøm 
 (1938-1963) Hans Lystrup 
 (1963-1987) Karen Marie Lystrup, gift Dinesen 
 (1987- ) Anita Dinesen, gift Halbye

References

External links
 Source

Manor houses in Vordingborg Municipality
Buildings and structures in Denmark associated with the Dinesen family